Harry Manson may refer to:
Harry Manson (ice hockey)
Harry Manson (soccer)